The Orange County Sheriff's Department (OCSD) is the law enforcement agency serving Orange County, California. It currently serves the unincorporated areas of Orange County and thirteen contract cities in the county: Aliso Viejo, Dana Point, Laguna Hills, Laguna Niguel, Laguna Woods, Lake Forest, Mission Viejo, Rancho Santa Margarita, San Clemente, San Juan Capistrano, Stanton, Villa Park, and Yorba Linda.

The agency also provides law enforcement services to the Orange County Transportation Authority (OCTA) system, and John Wayne Airport. OCSD also runs Orange County's Harbor Patrol, which provides law enforcement, marine fire fighting, search and rescue, and underwater search and recovery services along the county's  of coastline and in the county's three harbors (Dana Point, Newport and Huntington).

The OC Sheriff is Don Barnes.

History

Early years
The Orange County Sheriff's Department came into existence on August 1, 1889, when a proclamation of the state legislature separated the southern portion of Los Angeles County and created Orange County.  The entire department consisted of Sheriff Richard Harris and Deputy James Buckley, with an operating budget of $1,200 a year and a makeshift jail in the rented basement of a store in Santa Ana.  They served a sparsely populated county of 13,000 residents, scattered throughout isolated townships and settlements.  The problems faced by the first sheriff were typical for a frontier county – tracking down outlaws, controlling vagrancy, and attempting to maintain law and order across  of farmland and undeveloped territory.

Since the county was expanding, the department grew with it.  The Spurgeon Square Jail was opened by Sheriff Joe Nichols in 1897, and the Orange County Courthouse followed in 1901. Sheriff Theo Lacy (the second and fourth sheriff of Orange County, who served from 1890 to 1894 and from 1899 to 1911) was able to move from borrowed office space in Santa Ana to a dedicated headquarters in the courthouse that remained in operation until 1924.

When he took office in 1911, Sheriff Charles Ruddock commanded a staff of eight full-time deputies and jailers, serving a county of nearly 34,000 citizens.  But the county's frontier past returned to haunt it on December 16, 1912, when Undersheriff Robert Squires became the first member of the department to be killed in the line of duty while part of a posse attempting to apprehend a violent fugitive.

The county's growing population brought new challenges.  Most of the county had outlawed liquor by the time Sheriff Calvin Jackson took office in 1915.  Raids of "blind pig" businesses that served as fronts for illegal liquor sales were commonplace.  When Congress passed the 18th Amendment in 1920, Prohibition became the law of the land.  Suppressing illegal liquor operations became a major focus for the department over the next decade. 
 
By the time Sheriff Sam Jernigan took office in 1923, rum runners and bootleggers were commonplace along the coastline and in Orange County's harbors, using them as a base of operation for smuggling Canadian liquor into the country.  Thanks to Jernigan's diligence, many of them ended up serving time in the new county jail on Sycamore Street in Santa Ana, a building that would serve as OCSD's main jail and headquarters for the next forty-four years.  Jernigan remained in office until the end of the decade.  By 1930, the department had grown to include eighteen full-time personnel with an operating budget of $49,582.  The county's population was approaching 119,000, over half of which was scattered across a mostly rural landscape.

Sheriff Logan Jackson assumed office in 1931, and for the next eight years guided the department through a turbulent decade.  The Long Beach earthquake of 1933 caused widespread damage throughout the county, especially in Santa Ana.  In 1938, a week of intense rain overflowed the Santa Ana River, causing a massive flood that caused over $30 million in damage.  The sheriff also had to deal with the Citrus Riots of 1936, an agricultural labor dispute that led to a strike and subsequent disturbance so large that Sheriff Jackson swore in over four hundred special deputies to help control the violence. Sheriff Jackson believed that the labor unrest, caused by the depressed wages of citrus workers, was fomented by Communists.  On July 7, 1936, he issued a "Shoot to Kill" order, claiming "This is no fight between orchardists and pickers... it is a fight between the entire population of Orange County and a bunch of Communists."  His actions created a reign of terror for striking citrus workers   But Jackson's term in office also saw advancements for the department, such as an expansion of the Sycamore Jail that included the county's first radio dispatch center.  One of his final acts as sheriff was to implement the wearing of uniforms and a standardized badge for all thirty of his deputies.

World War II and the Creation of the Reserve Bureau
Sheriff Jesse Elliott replaced Jackson in 1939, just as the Depression was ending and the county once again began to prosper.  This peaceful time was cut short by the outbreak of World War II in 1941, which created challenges unlike any others in department history.  Most of Orange County's peace officers left for war, leaving the department critically understaffed.  This was made worse by the fact that in addition to his normal responsibilities, the sheriff was now required to assist with mandatory civil defense measures such as air raid drills and blackouts, as well as help police the seven wartime military bases within the county borders.  Elliott suddenly found himself responsible for twice as many duties with only a fraction of his former staff to carry them out.  To meet this need, he formed the Sheriff's Emergency Reserve, which eventually became the department's current Reserve Bureau.

Post-World War II
In 1946, retired NFL star and former deputy James A. Musick came home from the war and successfully ran for the office of sheriff, assuming command in 1947.  He would serve as sheriff for the next twenty-eight years – the longest term in department history.  When he took office, the county was still mostly rural, with a population of 216,000 served by a department of only seventy-six.  During Musick's administration, a number of divisions and facilities were commissioned that remain active to this day.  He implemented the county's first crime lab, its first Peace Officer's Training Center (now known as the Katella Facility), and the nation's first law enforcement Explorer post.  The 1960s saw the construction of the Orange County Industrial Farm (later renamed the James A. Musick Jail Facility), the Theo Lacy Facility, and the headquarters and central jails still in use today.  In response to the civil unrest of the late 1960s, Musick formed the Emergency Action Group Law Enforcement (EAGLE) team, a group of deputies with specialized training in various riot control and specialized tactics.  Although the team disbanded several years later, certain platoons evolved into the modern-day SWAT, Hazardous Devices, and Mounted Patrol units.  The department grew even larger when the Coroner's Office merged with it in 1971.  By the time Musick retired in 1974, the county had expanded to a rapidly urbanizing population of over 1,400,000, with the department having grown to a staff of over 900.

Musick's handpicked successor was Brad Gates, who became sheriff in 1975.  The department continued its rapid expansion during his administration, with the merging of two more agencies – the Orange County Harbor Patrol and the Stanton Police Department.  In response to severe jail overcrowding, the Intake Release Center was opened in 1988, completing the modern-day Central Jails Complex.  Gates also established the Air Support Bureau and created the Laser Village tactical training center, as well as the county's first DNA laboratory.  The continuing urbanization of the county resulted in several cities incorporating and becoming contract patrol areas.  Gates also steered the department through the challenges of a severe county bankruptcy in 1994. By the time he retired in 1999, the department had grown to over 3000 members.

Sheriff Carona
Sheriff Michael Carona took office in 1999 and oversaw a merger of the Orange County Marshal's Department (his former agency) with OCSD.  His term brought additional department expansion, including a modernized Katella Facility and a new OCSD Academy in Tustin.  Patrol cars were equipped with mobile computers, and anti-terrorism units were formed in response to the events of September 11, 2001.  Carona received an initial surge in popularity due to the department's handling of high-profile cases such as the abduction and murder of Samantha Runnion. In 2007, Carona and former members of his executive staff were indicted on multiple corruption charges. He was convicted of a felony and entered Englewood Federal Correctional Institution in January 2011. Carona was released in May 2015 to complete his sentence by home confinement.

Carona's replacement, retired L.A. Sheriff's Commander Sandra Hutchens, was appointed by the County Board of Supervisors after a nationwide search for a suitable candidate. Hutchens reorganized the agency after assuming office and created new branches such as the Homeland Security Division, a unified command for the various bureaus responsible for the county's security. In 2016 the Board of Supervisors approved a contract expanding the department's budget, raising deputy salaries "8.5 percent" and costing taxpayers "an additional $62.2 million" overall.

Beds for Feds (2010-2019)
In 2010 OCSD and Immigration and Customs Enforcement (ICE) reached an agreement that would allow federal detainees to be placed in Orange County Jail facilities and several county deputies to be cross trained as ICE Special Agents. While this contract was set to expire in July 2020, Sheriff-Coroner Don Barnes announced in 2019 that the County intended to terminate the contract early. Barnes explained that the decision was not politically motivated but rather a "business decision" due to the relatively small detainee population, and resulting scarcity of federal funding. Barnes also emphasized that ending this contract with ICE would open up more jail beds for residents living with mental illness, and allow county personnel to shift priorities from detaining immigrants to incarcerating the mentally ill.

Organization
The OCSD is divided into twenty divisions covering five organizational functions: Public Protection; Jail Operations; Technical Services such as investigations, coroner services, and emergency management; and Administrative and Support Services.

The Orange County Marshal's Department was absorbed by OCSD on July 1, 2000; then-Sheriff Michael Carona was the last Marshal.  OCSD, under its Court Operations Division, now provides all security and law enforcement services (such as Bailiff services, weapons screening checkpoints and prisoner custody) to the county court system.

The OCSD currently has 1,460 sworn deputies and over 1,446 civilian personnel, with another 800 reserve personnel.

The sidearm of choice is generally made by Glock and is chambered for .40 S&W, since 2020 the OCSD has allowed for the use of 9mm. However deputies are also allowed to purchase a sidearm of their own that they can carry and another favored sidearm by some is the SIG Sauer P320, which is also carried by Sheriff Barnes.

Command Staff

Executive Command
Sheriff-Coroner Don Barnes
Undersheriff Jeff Hallock

Administrative Services Command
Executive Director Brian Wayt
Senior Director Robert Beaver
Communications and Technology
Financial/Administrative Services
Research and Development
Support Services

Custody Operations Command
Assistant Sheriff William Baker
Commander Joe Balicki
Central Jail Complex
Musick Facility
Theo Lacy Facility
Intake Release Center and Transportation
Inmate Services

Professional Services Command
Assistant Sheriff Jon Briggs
Commander Jason Park
Court Services 
Professional Standards
S.A.F.E.
Training
Force

Field Operations and Investigative Services Command
Assistant Sheriff Jeff Hallock
Commander Dave Sawyer-Field Operations
Commander Ken Burmood-Investigative Services
Coroner 
Airport Operations
OC Crime Lab
Homeland Security
Emergency Management
Investigations
North Operations
Southeast Operations
Southwest Operations
OCTA Police Services

Rank structure

Sworn
Sheriff-Coroner (1)
Undersheriff (1)
Assistant Sheriff (3)
Commander (4)
Captain (15) / Chief Deputy Coroner
Lieutenant / Assistant Chief Deputy Coroner
Sergeant / Supervising Deputy Coroner
Investigator
Master Field Training Officer
Deputy Sheriff II / Senior Deputy Coroner
Deputy Sheriff I / Deputy Coroner
Reserve Deputy Sheriff

Non-sworn
Sheriff's Special Officer II
Sheriff's Special Officer I
Sheriff's Crime Scene Investigators
Sheriff's Correctional Services Assistant
Sheriff's Community Services Officer
Sheriff's Correctional Services Technician
Sheriff's Crime Prevention Specialists
Sheriff's Professional Staff
Sheriff's Cadets

Explorers

Field Operations and Investigative Services

John Wayne Airport Police Services
John Wayne Airport Police Services provides responsive and professional service to John Wayne Airport.  The Bureau consists of Deputy Sheriffs and Sheriff's Special Officers along with Explosive Detection Teams They pro-actively protect lives and property at this facility and respond to all calls for service promptly. In addition to these services they remain vigilant against threats (foreign or domestic) to ensure the security and safe operation of this facility. All Airport Police Services employees are expected to represent the department and John Wayne Airport in a friendly, helpful, and professional manner. The current head of John Wayne Airport Police Services is Commander Mark Gonzales.
John Wayne Airport

Coroner

OC Crime Lab

Emergency Management

Homeland Security Division
The division is composed of five separate bureaus, each with a nexus to local homeland security. Each one is run by a lieutenant or administrative manager. These bureaus are led by Captain Ross Caouette.
 Special Enforcement Bureau (SWAT section/Canine Services/Air-Support Unit/Hazardous Devices Unit/Tactical Arrest Team/Crisis Negotiators Team)
 Mass Transit Bureau (OCTA /Explosive Detection Unit/Module-Rail section)
 Marine Operations Bureau (Newport Beach Station/Dana Point Station/Sunset-Huntington Station)
 Mutual-Aid Bureau (Counter Terrorism section-JTTF/Grants/Sheriff's Response Team)
 Orange County Intelligence and Assessment Center

Orange County Harbor Patrol - Marine Operations

Orange County Harbor Patrol includes maritime security and enforcement of laws in Orange County's Harbors.  Sheriff's personnel frequently work in conjunction with Federal Homeland Security, and United States Coast Guard for interdiction of contraband and human trafficking. The current head of Harbor Patrol is Orange County Harbormaster, Lieutenant Chris Corn.
Sunset Beach Harbor, California
Newport Harbor, California
Dana Point Harbor, California

Aircraft

The department's 5 helicopters are (3 Eurocopter AS350 B2 [or "A*Stars"] and 2 rescue UH-1H Huey's) use the radio call sign "Duke" (after actor and Newport Beach resident John Wayne) and, appropriately, use John Wayne Airport as their operational base. The original "Duke" helicopters (a pair of Boeing 500s) had an image of John Wayne riding atop a sheriff's badge (while waving his cowboy hat) painted on the fuselage. The Aviation Unit covers the 13 contract cities the department serves, unincorporated communities, as well as a contract with the Santa Ana police department.

OC Transit Police Services
The mission of the OCTA Transit Police Services is to maintain a safe and peaceful environment for OCTA customers and employees, and to ensure the security of OCTA property. The current head of OCTA Police Services is Lieutenant Miguel Sotelo. 
Orange County Transit Authority

Investigations
The Investigations Division comprises the Criminal Investigations and Special Investigations Bureaus. The Criminal Investigations Division is based out of headquarters in Santa Ana, California. The Special Investigations division is stationed across the county headquarters, John Wayne Airport, and the Aliso Viejo station. The current head of the Investigations Division is Captain Andy Stephens.

Criminal Investigations Bureau
Lieutenant Kevin Navarro
Bank Robbery Apprehension Team
Computer Forensics Detail
Crime Analysis Detail
Cyber Crimes Detail
Economic Crimes
Family Protection Detail
Homicide Detail
Special Victims Detail

Special Investigations Bureau
Lieutenant Tracy Morris
Gang Enforcement
Narcotics/Vice
Specialized Task Forces
Special Operations
Highway Interdiction Team

North Operations
North Operations includes patrol and investigative services for the northern boundaries of Orange County, this division is based out of Sheriff's Headquarters in Santa Ana, California. The current head of North Operations is Captain Jeff Puckett.

Emergency Communications Bureau

Control One
Dispatch

North Patrol
Lieutenant Pat Rich
Unincorporated areas of
Anaheim
Brea
Costa Mesa
Garden Grove
La Habra
Newport Beach
Orange
Placentia
Santa Ana
Tustin
Communities of
Emerald Bay
Midway City
Rossmoor
Silverado Canyon
City of
Stanton
Villa Park
Yorba Linda

Security Bureau
The purpose of the Security Bureau is to provide uniform law enforcement presence at contracted county facilities
Lieutenant Roger Guevara
Contracted Facilities
Chief Executive Office
The Orange County Clerk-Recorder
Assessor and Treasury/ Tax Collector
County Social Services Agency
Child Support Services
Probation
Health Care Agency
Hall of Administration

North Investigations
North Investigations consists of general criminal investigations, in-custody court liaison and jail crimes. North Investigators are responsible for The City of Villa Park, county facilities, county parks, the unincorporated communities within North Operations, jail facilities, justice facilities, John Wayne Airport, and the Orange County Fairgrounds

Stanton Police Services
Stanton Police Services includes patrol and investigative services for the city of Stanton, California after the Stanton Police Department was absorbed by OCSD. The current head of Stanton Police Services is Lieutenant Nathan Wilson.
Stanton, California

Yorba Linda Police Services
The Sheriff's Department has provided law enforcement services to the City of Yorba Linda since January 2013 after the city decided not to renew its contract with the Brea Police Department. The current head of Yorba Linda Police Services is Lieutenant Cory Martino
Yorba Linda

Southeast Operations
The Southeast Operations Division provides law enforcement services to southeast boundaries of Orange County. The division is based out of the Saddleback Station in the City of  Lake Forest, California.

Contract Cities
Captain Jared Dahl
Cities of
Lake Forest, California
Mission Viejo, California
Rancho Santa Margarita, California

South Patrol
Lieutenant Brent Benson
Communities of
Coto de Caza, California
Ladera Ranch, California
Las Flores, California
Ortega Highway
Trabuco Canyon, California
Wagon Wheel, California

Southwest Operations
The Southwest Operations Division provides law enforcement services to southwest boundaries of Orange County. The division is based out of the Aliso Viejo Station in the City of  Aliso Viejo, California. The current head of Southwest Operations is Captain Jim England.

Captain Jim England
Cities of
Aliso Viejo, California
Dana Point, California
Laguna Hills, California
Laguna Niguel, California
Laguna Woods, California
San Clemente, California
San Juan Capistrano, California
 
In 1993 San Clemente Police Department was absorbed into OCSD, however San Clemente only allows the former San Clemente Police Station to be used by deputies who patrol their city.

Training Division
The Training Division develops, schedules, and presents law enforcement training for sworn peace officers and professional staff.  The department utilizes two training sites ensuring the best learning environment possible, depending on the specific needs of the course.  Advanced officer training is primarily conducted at the Katella Facility in Orange.  Academy and entry level training is primarily conducted at the Sheriff's Regional Training Academy in Tustin.  The Orange County Sheriff's Department, as well as multiple local, state and even federal public safety agencies train at and utilize both sites.  Extensive input from law enforcement and other leaders throughout the county help to mold the curriculum and training that is offered.  Both facilities are often utilized seven days per week and include daytime and evening instruction.  The division is led by Captain Brad Virgoe.

The Orange County Sheriff's Regional Training Academy is located in Tustin, California, on the site of the former Tustin Marine Corps Air Station. The facility opened in late 2007 and replaced the old academy on Salinas Avenue in Garden Grove which was no longer adequate due to overcrowding. [1] The Orange County Sheriff's Regional Training Academy produces highly trained and professional Deputy Sheriffs & Police Officers, Sheriff's Special Officers, and Correctional Services Assistants. Some training is also conducted at a Sheriff's facility on Katella Avenue in Orange, California.

The Katella Training Facility in Orange, California, houses the qualifications range, tactical range, administrative offices, advanced officer training, and elements of Homeland Security Division's Special Enforcement Bureau.

Some of the Orange County municipal agencies that send their recruit officers to OCSA include Newport Beach Police Department, Laguna Beach Police Department, Irvine Police Department, Costa Mesa Police Department, University of California Irvine Police Department, Fullerton Police Department, Garden Grove Police Department, Westminster Police Department, La Habra Police Department, Brea Police Department, Placentia Police Department, Tustin Police Department, and Orange Police Department.

Orange County residents are not the only recipients of the Orange County Sheriff's Academy's highly trained peace officers.  Many Los Angeles County municipal police agencies send their recruits to be trained by the those at OCSA.  Some of these agencies include; Beverly Hills Police Department, Santa Monica Police Department, University of California Los Angeles Police Department, Torrance Police Department, Hawthorne Police Department, Palos Verdes Estates Police Department, Redondo Beach Police Department, Manhattan Beach Police Department, South Gate Police Department, Burbank Police Department, Glendale Police Department, and more.

Jails

The OCSD Custody Operations Division operates four jails:
Central Men's Jail and Women's Jail - The Central Jail Complex, opened in 1968, is located next to the department offices in Santa Ana. It houses approximately 2,664 inmates. In January 2016, three inmates escaped from the jail. 
Intake Release Center (IRC) - In 1988 as a part of the Central Jail Complex, the Intake Release Center was built to facilitate the intake and processing of inmates, and the including medical screening, booking, properidentification, and transfers between facilities. While it is a transitional facility, it also holds male and female inmates for brief periods.
Theo Lacy Facility - The TLF, located in the city of Orange, was originally built in 1960. A major expansion completed in 2006 brought its capacity to 3,100 inmates, making it the largest jail in the county.
James A. Musick Facility - A minimum security facility located on unincorporated county land near Lake Forest and Irvine, "The Farm" provides custodial and rehabilitative programs for 1256 adult male and female inmates.

Courts
After the Orange County Marshal's Department was absorbed by OCSD, the sheriff's department became responsible for providing court services. There are Sheriff's personnel stationed at the Justice Centers throughout the County. Sheriff's staff at the Justice Centers fulfill the vital mission of the Sheriff that include bailiff services in each courtroom and weapons screening operations in the lobby of each Justice Center.  Each justice center houses a detention holding facility for inmates who are appearing in court each day.  These detention facilities are staffed by Deputy Sheriffs.  There are also Deputies assigned to the Civil Enforcement Bureau who handle services in every city of the county serving restraining orders and court subpoenas, conducting evictions, and effecting bench warrants.  The Special Operations and Judicial Protection Unit provides specialized protective and investigative services to counter any threats, perceived or real towards the judiciary of the Superior Court of California, County of Orange.  All of these personnel fall under the Court Operations Command of the OCSD Professional Services Command. The current head of court operations is Captain Jim Rudy.
Orange County Sheriff's Offices are located at the following Superior Court of California facilities in the County of Orange:
Central Justice Center (CJC) in Santa Ana
Lamoreaux Family & Juvenile Law Justice Center (LJC) in Orange
North Justice Center (NJC) in Fullerton
West Justice Center (WJC) in Westminster
Harbor Justice Center (HJC) in Newport Beach

Orange County Sheriff's Department Explorer Post 449
In November 1959, Orange County Sheriff James A. Musick wanted "young men," who desired exposure in the field of law enforcement to be afforded the opportunity to do so. In a newspaper article he stated, "We organized the group after we found that other special interest Explorer Posts were taking our best young men from our high schools. We decided, rather than take what was left over after other fields of endeavor took the best, that we should start training young men of high school age now for a career in law enforcement."

Thus, the first Law Enforcement Exploring Post in the nation was established. Its purposes were, "To train young men of today for the future that awaits them in the law enforcement field of tomorrow. To stimulate young men's interest in law enforcement practices, the code of ethics, and the fine qualities of citizenship which are expected, to briefly explore all phases of law enforcement and to be a definite approach to juvenile decency." Post 449 began with twenty-eight explorers in Santa Ana who had to meet the qualifications of being "between 14 and 21, must maintain a "B" average in school, have a clean record, be of outstanding citizenship in their community and have a general reputation beyond reproach."

In 1973, after fifteen years of only young men being allowed in the Exploring program, Boy Scouts of America allowed young women to explore careers in law enforcement through membership in a Explorer Program. Maintaining the same high standards for qualification and training these young women diversified the Department's Post.

When the residents of contract cities and the unincorporated county area need help they call the Sheriff's Department; when the Sheriff's Department needs help they call on their Explorers. The Orange County Sheriff's Explorer Post supports deputies during road closures caused by natural disasters such as mudslides, floods and forest fires. They complete search missions where either missing persons or evidence is sought and are deployed to protect crime scene perimeters. This involvement, by the Explorers, allows patrol deputies to be available for calls for service.

Explorers are also used to assist in public education. They distribute brochures explaining changes in parking regulations or temporary street closures. During Bicycle Rodeo Events, Explorers demonstrate to children how to properly size and wear bicycle helmets. They offer child identification and crime awareness, through a "Kid-Print" program and assist in crime prevention demonstrations throughout the county.

The Department's Explorers serve the community by providing crowd and traffic control during Basic Academy Graduations, County Building Dedications, Mall grand openings, Community awareness fairs, 10 K runs, parades and a multitude of other charitable events. The Post's Color guard is used to present the flag at City Council and County Board of Supervisor meetings, as well as scouting and civic events.

The Orange County Sheriff's Department Explorers participate in Law Enforcement competitions throughout the state. Through the use of the Department's "Laser Village" and its Training Staff, Post 449 Explorers have learned skills which enabled them to win several awards in Felony Car Stop, D.U.I., Bomb Threat and Search and Building Search scenarios. The Explorers also compete in Tug-of War, Volleyball and Obstacle Course competitions.

Sheriff's personnel, who volunteer as Advisors for the Department's Post, contribute countless hours exposing youths to Law Enforcement Careers. Their commitment to the advancement of the Exploring program goes beyond the Department's Post. The Department's Advisors also serve on the County-wide Organization as Ranking Officials, Academy Directors, Tactical Training Officers and Instructors at the Explorer Academy. In addition to Orange County, these Advisors have trained and taught Explorers from Kern, Los Angeles, San Diego, Riverside and Ventura counties.

List of sheriffs
Richard T. Harris (1889–1891)
Theo Lacy (1891–1895)
Joe C. Nichols (1895–1899)
Theo Lacy (1899–1911)
Charles Ruddock (1911–1915)
Calvin E. Jackson (1915–1923)
Sam Jernigan (1923–1931)
Logan Jackson (1931–1939)
Jesse L. Elliott (1939–1947)
James A. Musick (1947–1975)
Brad Gates (1975–1999)
Michael Carona (1999–2008)
Jack Anderson (Assistant Sheriff, acting as Sheriff) (January–June 2008)
Sandra Hutchens (2008–January 7, 2019)
Don Barnes (January 7, 2019–)

See also

 List of law enforcement agencies in California

References

External links
 Orange County Sheriff's Department

Sheriffs' departments of California
1889 establishments in California
Government agencies established in 1889
Emergency services in Orange County, California
Government in Orange County, California